This is a list of episodes for the ninth season (1958–59) of the television version of The Jack Benny Program.

Episodes

References
 
 

1958 American television seasons
1959 American television seasons
Jack 09